Kimberly is an unincorporated community in Randolph County, in the U.S. state of Missouri.

History
Kimberly had is start in 1895 as a mining community. A post office called Kimberly was established in 1900, and remained in operation until 1905. The community takes its name from the mining center of Kimberley, South Africa.

References

Unincorporated communities in Randolph County, Missouri
Unincorporated communities in Missouri